The 2016 Supercar Challenge powered by Pirelli was the sixteenth Supercar Challenge season since it replaced the Supercar Cup in 2001. It began at Circuit Zolder on April 16 and ended at TT Circuit Assen on October 23.

Calendar
Due to noise restrictions the Supercar Challenge would not be competing at Zandvoort during the Opening Races on April 8 to April 10. As a replacement the Supercar Challenge went to Zolder on April 15 to April 17 during the New Race Festival. The event at the Slovakia Ring was moved a week from the original date before being replaced by Snetterton after all.

Entry list

Race results

Championship standings

Scoring system
Championship points were awarded based on finishing positions as shown in the chart below. The pole-sitter in Race 1 and Race 2 and the driver with the fastest lap in Race 1 and Race 2 also received one point. The grid for Race 1 was decided by a normal qualifying, but the grid for Race 2 was decided by everyone's second best time in qualifying. If a guest driver got Pole Position, the point would go to the best qualified regular driver. If a guest driver had the fastest lap, the point would go to the regular driver with the fastest lap. Entries were required to complete 75% of the winning car's (per division) race distance in order to be classified and earn points. All results counted towards the year-end standings. There were no scratch results. If there were in a division on average less than five participants the overall points standing would be reduced with 75%.

Drivers' championships

Super GT/GTB

Notes
1 – Michael Verhagen was a guest driver during the Dutch on Tour and was ineligible to score points.

Supersport/Sport

Notes
1 – Hielke Oosten was a guest driver during the Spa Euro Races and was ineligible to score points.

Superlights 1/Superlights 2

See also
Supercar Challenge (series)

Notes

References

External links

2016 in motorsport
2016 in Dutch motorsport
2016 in European sport